Robert Bernard Hall (January 28, 1812 – April 15, 1868) was a member of the United States House of Representatives from Massachusetts.  He was born in Boston on January 28, 1812.  He entered the Boston Latin School, studied theology at Yale Divinity School in New Haven, Connecticut where he graduated in 1835, and was ordained to the ministry, first as a Congregationalist and then as an Episcopalian.  Hall was one of the twelve original members of Garrison’s Anti-Slavery Society.

He moved to Plymouth, Massachusetts and served in the Massachusetts State Senate.   He was elected as the candidate of the American Party to the Thirty-fourth Congress and reelected as a Republican to the Thirty-fifth Congress (March 4, 1855 – March 3, 1859).  Hall was a delegate to the National Union Convention in Philadelphia, and died in Plymouth on April 15, 1868.  Interment was in Oak Grove Cemetery.

External links
 

1812 births
1868 deaths
Politicians from Boston
Massachusetts state senators
Massachusetts Whigs
Know-Nothing members of the United States House of Representatives from Massachusetts
Republican Party members of the United States House of Representatives from Massachusetts
19th-century American politicians
Yale Divinity School alumni
Boston Latin School alumni
19th-century American Episcopalians